Washington Assis do Nascimento Junior (born 20 December 1996 in Rio de Janeiro) is a Brazilian Paralympic sprinter. He won bronze in the 100m T47 in 2020.

References

External links
 

1996 births
Living people
Brazilian male sprinters
Paralympic athletes of Brazil
Paralympic bronze medalists for Brazil
Paralympic medalists in athletics (track and field)
Medalists at the 2020 Summer Paralympics
Athletes (track and field) at the 2020 Summer Paralympics
Sportspeople from Rio de Janeiro (city)
21st-century Brazilian people